Siege of Steenwijk may refer to:

 Siege of Steenwijk (1580–81)
 Siege of Steenwijk (1592)